

Group A









Group B









References

Africa U-20 Cup of Nations squads